Charles Edward Johnson (born May 2, 1984) is a former American football guard. He played college football for the Oklahoma State University Cowboys, and was drafted by the Indianapolis Colts in the sixth round of the 2006 NFL Draft. He won Super Bowl XLI with the Colts against the Chicago Bears.

Early years
Johnson attended Sherman High School in Sherman, Texas, the same high school former Colts' punter Hunter Smith attended. At Oklahoma State, he was converted from a tight end to an offensive tackle.

Professional career

Indianapolis Colts

Johnson was selected with the Indianapolis Colts' sixth-round pick in the 2006 NFL draft. As a rookie, he started one game, filling in for the injured right tackle Ryan Diem against Tennessee in week 13, and, additionally, filled in for Diem for a portion of Super Bowl XLI.

Due to the retirement of stalwart LT Tarik Glenn, Johnson had an opportunity to win the starting left tackle job during his second season, but was beaten out by rookie Tony Ugoh. Injuries to Ugoh and Diem, however, led to Johnson starting 10 of 16 games at LT and RT, respectively. Johnson's performance during the 2007 was widely viewed by fans as a disappointment (that season marked the first time in five years that the Colts finished out of the top 5 in least sacks allowed), considering the competence he had shown as a rookie.

In Johnson's third season, he was moved to left guard in order to compensate for the loss of injured starter Ryan Lilja. Johnson started all 16 games, 12 at LG and 4 at LT, and was one of only two starting OL (the other being Ryan Diem) to play in every game that season.

The following year, Johnson beat out underachieving starter Tony Ugoh for the starting LT position during training camp. Through six games, Johnson had demonstrated solid improvement at his position, in contrast to previous years' performances.

Minnesota Vikings
On August 1, 2011, Johnson signed with the Minnesota Vikings. He played left tackle in his first full season with the Vikings but was then moved to left guard after the team drafted tackle Matt Kalil from USC.

On February 27, 2015, Johnson was released by the Vikings.

He is currently (2017) the offensive line coach for Stillwater High School in Stillwater, Oklahoma.

Personal life
On December 18, 2012, Johnson appeared on an episode of Ink Master where he received a tattoo of a dragon on his right forearm by contestant Tatu Baby.

External links

Minnesota Vikings bio
Indianapolis Colts bio

1984 births
Living people
People from Durant, Oklahoma
People from Sherman, Texas
Players of American football from Texas
African-American players of American football
American football offensive guards
American football offensive tackles
Sherman High School (Texas) alumni
Oklahoma State Cowboys football players
Indianapolis Colts players
Minnesota Vikings players
21st-century African-American sportspeople
20th-century African-American people